George Beim (born August 29, 1942) is a former American soccer player and coach.

Early life
Born in Riga, Latvia, Beim fled with his family during the  Communist invasion of the Baltic area in 1943.  They subsequently settled in Wangen, Germany and immigrated to the United States in 1951.

Beim attended Nyack High School in Nyack, New York, where he excelled as a soccer player.  He was a three-year starter, and was selected each year to the play for the All-Star team as a goalkeeper.  He was the first soccer player to receive a scholarship from the University of North Carolina.  After his freshman year, he switched to playing in the field, and was selected to the All-South team as a midfielder his sophomore year.  As a three-year starter at UNC, he ended up playing every one of the eleven positions on the team at one time or another during his collegiate career.  Beim graduated in 1964 with a bachelor's degree in physical education.

Amateur career
After college, Beim moved to the Washington, D.C. area, where he played amateur soccer in the National Soccer League of the Maryland and D.C. Soccer Association, for the Central Valet team (’64-’65) that won the area championship in 1965.  He also played for the Britannica Soccer Club (’65-’67) that won the league championship in 1966, and advanced to the quarterfinals of the National Amateur Cup. He later played for the British Lions (’67-’68) as well.  He was selected to the Washington, DC All-Star team in 1967.

Professional career
Beim had a brief stay with the Atlanta Chiefs of the NASL in 1965, and was a member of the Baltimore St. Gerards team of the American Soccer League (ASL) in 1967 when they won the ASL Championship.  In 1968, he played for the Boston Astors, also of the ASL.

Coaching career
Beim started coaching while in the Washington, DC area, and was the head coach at Walt Whitman High School in Bethesda, MD from 1964 to 1967.  In 1967, he became the head coach at St. Francis College in Biddeford, ME, and after two successful seasons there was appointed the head soccer coach at Dartmouth College at the age of just 29.

In 1975 Beim joined the staff of the Baltimore Comets of the North American Soccer League (NASL).  In 1984, he accepted the position as President, General Manager Professional Soccer League, which was later the National Professional Soccer League.  He also served on the board of directors of the newly formed AISA.

Personal
After retiring from coaching, Beim pursued a career in sports marketing, and is currently the President/CEO of Pinnacle Management Group, Inc., a sports marketing and event management firm.  The firm has managed numerous celebrity golf events and dinners including The Ron Jaworski Celebrity Golf Challenge, and NFL Alumni events in a number of cities.

Beim has written three soccer coaching books:  Principles of Modern Soccer, published by Houghton Mifflin, as well as Youth Soccer and Coaching Youth Soccer published by The Athletic Institute.  In addition, he authored the pictorial book, Babe Ruth: A Daughter’s Portrait, published by Taylor Publishing.

He is married to the former Caterina Frances Modafferi, and the two reside in Leesburg, Virginia.  Their four daughters Kim, Pam, Beth and Heather also all live in the Washington – Baltimore area.

References

External links
 www.pinnaclemanagementgroup.com

1942 births
Living people
American people of Latvian descent
American soccer players
American soccer coaches
Dartmouth Big Green men's soccer coaches
People from Leesburg, Virginia
Association footballers not categorized by position
People from Nyack, New York
North Carolina Tar Heels men's soccer players
Soccer players from New York (state)
Atlanta Chiefs players
North American Soccer League players
American Soccer League (1933–1983) players
North American Soccer League (1968–1984) coaches
American Indoor Soccer Association coaches
National Professional Soccer League (1984–2001) coaches
Nyack High School alumni